Stephen Rhett Cansdell (born 23 September 1950 in Dubbo) is an Australian former professional boxer and former member of the New South Wales Legislative Assembly.

He was Australian professional light heavyweight boxing champion in 1973/1974 and Queensland professional heavyweight boxing champion from 1978 to 1981. Cansdell became champion with a sixth-round knockout over Johnny Gorkom; he lost to Greg Mcnamara over ten rounds in a non-title fight. Cansdell later trained future light heavyweight world champion Jeff Harding.

He is married with four adult children. He was elected as a member of the Grafton City Council in 1993

Cansdell represented Clarence for the National Party from 2003 to 2011.

He resigned from parliament on 16 September 2011 over a false declaration related to a traffic offence. In 2019, Cansdell contested Clarence at the state election as a candidate for the Shooters, Fishers and Farmers Party (SFF); he received 17% of the votes.

Notes

External links

"MP reveals traumatic early years" by Lisa Carty, The Sydney Morning Herald (2 December 2007)

Members of the New South Wales Legislative Assembly
National Party of Australia members of the Parliament of New South Wales
Living people
1950 births
People from Grafton, New South Wales
Australian male boxers
21st-century Australian politicians
Shooters, Fishers and Farmers Party politicians